Gabriel was an American manufacturer of boutique guitar amplifiers. Founded by former Romanian, now American citizen Gabriel Bucataru in 2005, the company produced expensive, hand-built, all-tube amplifiers that have earned praise from professional reviewers--Vintage Guitar hailed the "impeccable built quality" and the "high end/high quality vibe" of the Voxer 33, and Guitar Player called the Voxer 18 "ultra-rich" and "with more versatility than many vintage amps can muster."In 2014 they announced that they have stopped all production.

Models
Voxer 18, a two-channel 18-watt amplifier available as combo and as head (with a 2x12" cabinet). Channel one utilizes a 12AX7 for a Marshall-type sound, and channel two an EF86 for a Vox-type sound. The amp is also available in a "lite" version, with only the EF86 channel.
Voxer 33, a two-channel 33-watt amplifier available as a head, or as a 1x12" or 2x12" combo.

Notable users of Gabriel Amplifiers
Vernon Reid of the rock group Living Colour
Lyle Workman
Pete Anderson
MercyMe guitarists Michael Scheuchzer and Barry Graul

References

External links
Company website

Guitar amplifier manufacturers
Audio equipment manufacturers of the United States